Teracotona pitmanni is a moth in the  family Erebidae. It was described by Rothschild in 1933. It is found in Kenya.

Subspecies
Teracotona pitmanni pitmanni
Teracotona pitmanni major Rothschild, 1933

References

Natural History Museum Lepidoptera generic names catalog

Endemic moths of Kenya
Moths described in 1933
Spilosomina